The Central Bloc of the Revolutionary Armed Forces of Colombia operated strategically in the Andes Mountains, around the middle of Colombia. The group was considered as the largest threat to Bogotá and its economy, as it operated in areas surrounding the capital.  Strong military action in the 2000s, however, forced the bloc to hide in remote parts of the mountains, away from many highways and cities.

The specific divisions of the group are arguable.bSome of the believed divisions or 'fronts', as they were commonly called, are shown below. Many of these fronts sometimes worked together towards a certain mission, while others were further divided into 'columns' and 'companies' with a smaller number of members. For more general information see FARC-EP Chain of Command.

Commanders

16th Front 
The 16th Front was responsible for the personal security of Alfonso Cano until he left the front in September 2011 and, together with a small group of 15 guerrillas, started moving south through Huila and Cauca. It had around 300 members in 2011.

17th Front 
Also known as the Angelino Godoy Front, it was composed by around 150 militants as of 2011.  It operated mostly in the Huila Department.  The leader of this front was José Orlando Orlando Ortiz, alias ‘Héctor Comidita’ Two members of the front died and 5 others surrenders after clashes with the Colombian army, on August 1, 2012.

21st Front 
Also known as La Gaitana Front, it was composed by up to 120 militants. It operates mostly in the Tolima and the Quindío Departments.

25th Front 
Also known as the Armando Ríos Front, it was composed by up to 120 militants. It operated mostly in the Tolima Department. It was responsible for several attacks against security forces in 2011 in the Huila and Caqueta departments. In July 2011, 9 members of the front were arrested and 2 others killed by security forces. Six other members were captured on October 12.

50th Front 
Also known as Cacique Calarcá Front, it was composed by up to 80 militants. It operated mostly in the Quindío and Risaralda Departments. The front was announced to have been dismantled by the Colombian Army in 2010.

66th Front 
Also known as the Joselo Lozada Front, it was composed by up to 150 militants. It operated mostly in the Huila Department.

Columns and Companies 
The following columns and companies were also part of the Central Bloc:

 Column 'Alfredo González'. Operated in the southern part of the Tolima department. It was led by alias 'Teófilo'. In June 2011 the column killed a Colombian soldier while losing its 4th in command 'Arnulfo' in combat.
Column Daniel Aldana:  This column was widely known in the Tolima Department, where most of its operations took place. Its financial director, known as "El Indio" was captured in 2005. In 2006, its last known leader Gustavo González López,  alias "Rambo", was killed by government troops. In April 2013, 13 members of the column were arrested
Column Héroes de Marquetalia:  This column also operated in the Tolima Department and was led by a female, Magaly Grannobles, alias "Marleny Rondón" and "Mayerly", killed on July 11, 2010 in Operation Berlín.
Column Jacobo Prías Alape:  This column also operated in the Tolima Department and was led by two people known as "Calderón" or "Chicharrón", and "Tribilín".
Company Tulio Varón:  Also known as the Front Tulio Varón, it operated in the Tolima Department. Its leader, Eduardo Fajardo, alias "Walter", was killed in March 2007.  Its preceding leader, Roberto Olaya Caicedo, alias "El Venado", was killed in late 2006.  It has since been dismantled and fused with the Column Jacobo Prías Alape.

References

FARC